Kshitij Wagh is an Indian playback singer and a composer.

He was contestant at the second season of Indian Idol in 2005 and 2006. His early education in music came from his father Ramesh Wagh. Later he also learnt music from Gandharva Mahavidyalaya, New Delhi.

Partial discography

References

External links
 

Bollywood playback singers
Indian male pop singers
Indian male playback singers
Living people
1977 births
Indian Idol participants